CHCE was a radio station which operated from 1923 to around 1925, in Victoria, British Columbia, Canada.

History
Four young men from Victoria formed the Western Canada Radio Supply Company to build and sell radio receivers.  Kenneth G. Moffatt was Manager and they opened a store on Fort Street that also housed a 5 watt transmitter.  It was on the air as CHCE for a few months broadcasting only music.

The station broadcast on 400 metres (750 kHz) with a power of only 5 watts. CHCE's licence was terminated around 1925.

External links
 

Radio stations in Victoria, British Columbia
HCE
1923 establishments in British Columbia
1925 disestablishments in British Columbia

Radio_stations_established_in_1923 
Radio_stations_disestablished_in_1925
HCE